John Roberts (born November 10, 1971) is an American actor, comedian, and writer who voices Linda Belcher on the animated sitcom Bob's Burgers.

Career

Roberts currently voices Linda, the doting matriarch of the Belcher family, in the Fox animated primetime comedy Bob's Burgers. He has said in interviews that he based the voice of Linda on that of his own mother, Marge.

He has appeared several times on NBC's Late Night with Jimmy Fallon and Watch What Happens: Live, has co-written a pilot for MTV with Bob Odenkirk and performed in two national tours for Margaret Cho as well as her Showtime special. Roberts first gained attention as one of the standout performer/writers on the YouTube follow up "Jackie & Debra" which won The Comedy Smalls award in London. He has over 20 million hits on YouTube and has made videos with the likes of Debbie Harry and David Cross. He performs several times a year at NYC's Joe's Pub and has signed a publishing deal with French Kiss Records.

On May 17, 2019, Roberts released the song "Looking". The freelance writer Randall Radic wrote that the music video "combines Roberts' love for '80s dance pop music with fluorescent lights, beau coup neon, mannequins, a vintage phone, and a studded leather jacket".

Personal life
Roberts is openly gay. He is of half-Italian and half-Irish descent.

Filmography

 Good Day New York
 It's on with Alexa Chung
 Late Night with Jimmy Fallon
 Eugene!
 Bob's Burgers (voice)
 Abby Hatcher, Fuzzly Catcher (voice)
 Archer (guest voice)
 Gravity Falls (guest voice)
 The Awesomes (guest voice)
 The Simpsons (guest voice)
 The Bob's Burgers Movie (voice)

References

External links
 
 
 John Roberts at the Internet Movie Database

Living people
American male television actors
American people of Italian descent
American people of Irish descent
American gay actors
Gay comedians
American gay writers
People from Brooklyn
American male voice actors
LGBT people from New York (state)
Male actors from New York City
1971 births
American LGBT comedians